Büchi arithmetic of base k is the first-order theory of the natural numbers with addition and the function  which is defined as the largest power of k dividing x, named in honor of the Swiss mathematician Julius Richard Büchi. The signature of Büchi arithmetic contains only the addition operation,  and equality, omitting the multiplication operation entirely.

Unlike Peano arithmetic, Büchi arithmetic is a decidable theory. This means it is possible to effectively determine, for any sentence in the language of Büchi arithmetic, whether that sentence is provable from the axioms of Büchi arithmetic.

Büchi arithmetic and automata
A subset  is definable in Büchi arithmetic of base k if and only if it is k-recognisable.

If  this means that the set of integers of X in base k is accepted by an automaton. Similarly if  there exists an automaton that reads the first digits, then the second digits, and so on, of n integers in base k, and accepts the words if the n integers are in the relation X.

Properties of Büchi arithmetic

If k and l are multiplicatively dependent, then the Büchi arithmetics of base k and l have the same expressivity.

Further, by the Cobham–Semënov theorem, if a relation is definable in both k and l Büchi arithmetics, then it is definable in Presburger arithmetic.

References

Further reading
 

Formal theories of arithmetic
Logic in computer science
Proof theory
Model theory